Zhu Liangcai (27 September 1900 – 22 February 1989) was a general in the Chinese People's Liberation Army.

Zhu was in Waisha Village, Rucheng County, Hunan Province. He joined the Chinese Communist Party in October 1927.

From 1955-1958, he was the political commissar of Beijing Military Region.

He was made a general in 1955. He was awarded first-class Eight-One medal, first-class Independence Freedom medal and first-class Liberation medal. In July 1988, he was awarded first-class Red Star Honorary Medal.

He died on 22 February 1989 in Beijing, at the age of 89.

See also
List of officers of the People's Liberation Army

1900 births
1989 deaths
People's Liberation Army generals from Hunan
Politicians from Chenzhou
Members of the Kuomintang
Chinese Communist Party politicians from Hunan
People's Republic of China politicians from Hunan